A feuilleton (a diminutive of , the leaf of a book) was originally a kind of supplement attached to the political portion of French newspapers, consisting chiefly of non-political news and gossip, literature and art criticism, a chronicle of the latest fashions, and epigrams, charades and other literary trifles. The term feuilleton was invented by the editors of the French Journal des débats; Julien Louis Geoffroy and Bertin the Elder, in 1800. The feuilleton has been described as a "talk of the town", and a contemporary English-language example of the form is the "Talk of the Town" section of The New Yorker. In English newspapers, the term instead came to refer to an installment of a serial story printed in one part of a newspaper.

History 

The feuilleton was the literary consequence of the Coup of 18 Brumaire (Dix-huit-Brumaire). A consular edict of January 17, 1800, made a clean sweep of the revolutionary press, and cut down the number of Paris newspapers to 13. Under the Consulate, and later on, the Empire, Le Moniteur Universel, which served as a propaganda mouthpiece for Napoleon Bonaparte, basically controlled what the other twelve Parisian publications could run. Julien Louis Geoffroy found that what might not be written in an editorial column might appear with perfect impunity on a lower level on the rez-de-chaussée, the "ground floor" of a journal. Geoffroy started the first feuilleton in the Journal des Débats. The idea caught on at once. The feuilleton, which dealt ostensibly with literature, the drama and other harmless topics, but which, nevertheless, could make political capital out of the failure of a book or a play, became quite powerful under the Napoleonic nose. The original feuilletons were not usually printed on a separate sheet, but merely separated from the political part of the newspaper by a line, and printed in smaller type.

Geoffroy's own feuilleton dealt with the theatre as he was a trenchant drama critic. By the time of his death in 1814, several other feuilletonists had made their mark, with Janin taking over from him. Feuilletonists featured in other papers included Théophile Gautier, Paul de St. Victor, Edmond de Biéville, Louis Ulbach and Francisque Sarcey, who occupied the "ground floor" of the Temps. Adolphe Adam, Hector Berlioz, and Coutil-Blaze wrote music-laden feuilletons. Babinet, Louis Figuier and Meunier focused on science. Bibliographical feuilletons were done by Armand de Pontmartin, Gastave Flanche, and Charles Augustin Sainte-Beuve.

However, the feuilleton would become a phenomenon only with the appearance of serialised novels. For instance, Alexandre Dumas' The Count of Monte Cristo, The Three Musketeers and Vingt Ans Apres all filled the "ground floors" of the Siècle. Eugène Sue's Mysteres de Paris ran in the Débate, and his Juif Errant (The Wandering Jew) appeared in the Constitutionnel. In The World of Yesterday, Stefan Zweig wrote of how the Neue Freie Presse'''s feuilleton, "in the lower half of the front page, separated sharply from the ephemera of politics and the day by an unbroken line that extended from margin to margin," had become the leading arbiter of literary culture in fin de siècle Vienna, such that a feuilleton writer's "yes or no... decided the success of a work, a play, or a book, and with it that of the author."

The feuilleton was a common genre in Russia, especially during the Government reforms of Alexander II of Russia. Fyodor Dostoevsky wrote feuilletons. The feuilletonistic tendency of his work has been explored by Zhernokleyev. By 1870  Dostoevsky parodied the feuilleton for its celebration of ephemeral culture.

Reference in Hesse novel 
In the novel The Glass Bead Game (1943) by Nobel Prize-winning novelist Hermann Hesse, the current era is characterised and described as "The Age of the Feuilleton".

 See also 

 Causerie
 Op-ed
 Column (newspaper)
 Serial novel
 Sunday Supplement
 The Third Culture (1995), book that inspired several German newspapers to integrate scientific reports into their feuilleton'' sections

References 

Newspapers